The White House executive pastry chef is responsible for the planning, managing and preparing of all desserts and pastries served at the White House, the official residence of the president of the United States. This includes state dinners, official dinners, and private entertaining by the first family.

The executive pastry chef works separately from the White House executive chef and reports directly to the chief usher. She works in coordination with these two, as well as the White House social secretary, and the first lady for all events and dinners. The executive pastry chef serves at the first lady's pleasure and is appointed, or reappointed, by each administration. 

The current White House executive pastry chef is Susan Morrison.

List of executive pastry chefs
 Heinz Bender, February 1968–January 1979
 Albert Kumin, February 1, 1979–December 31, 1979
 Roland Mesnier, 1980–2004
 Thaddeus DuBois, 2004–2006 
 Bill Yosses, 2007–2014
 Susan E. "Susie" Morrison, 2014–present

See also
 List of pastry chefs

References

External links
White House website page on Current Executive Pastry Chef Susan Morrison 
White House website page on former Executive Pastry Chef William Yosses
White House website page on former Executive Pastry Chef Roland Mesnier

Executive Pastry Chef, White House
Executive Pastry Chef, White House
Pastry chefs